The 2004 Mr. Olympia contest was an IFBB professional bodybuilding competition and the feature event of Joe Weider's 2004 Olympia Weekend held October 30–31, 2004 at the Mandalay Bay Arena in Las Vegas, Nevada.

Results

This Mr. Olympia contest introduced a new Challenge Round to determine the final standings.  The top six competitors scores were discarded after round three, and only the final challenge round standings were used to decide the winner.

The total prize money for the men's Mr. Olympia was $400,000.

Notable events

Ronnie Coleman won his seventh consecutive Mr. Olympia title
Jay Cutler, for a third time, placed runner-up
Although he placed third in traditional scoring, Dexter Jackson lost to Gustavo Badell in the final challenge round, for a prize difference of $10,000

See also
 2004 Ms. Olympia

References

External links 
 Mr. Olympia

 2004
2004 in American sports
Mr. Olympia 2004
2004 in bodybuilding